The CDTV (from Commodore Dynamic Total Vision, later treated as a backronym for Compact Disc Television) is a home multimedia entertainment and video game console – convertible into a full-fledged personal computer by the addition of optional peripherals – developed by Commodore International and launched in April 1991.

Description
The CDTV is essentially a Commodore Amiga 500 home computer with a CD-ROM drive and remote control. With the optional keyboard, mouse, and floppy disk drive, it gained the functionality of the regular Amiga. Commodore marketed the machine as an all-in-one multimedia appliance. As such, it targeted the same market as the Philips CD-i. The expected market for multimedia appliances did not materialize, and neither machine met with any real commercial success. Though the CDTV was based entirely on Amiga hardware, it was marketed strictly as a CDTV, with the Amiga name omitted from product branding.

Commodore announced the CDTV at the summer 1990 Consumer Electronics Show in Chicago, promising to release it before the end of the year with 100 software titles. The product debuted in North America in March 1991 (CES Las Vegas) and in the UK (World of Commodore 1991 at Earls Court, London). It was advertised at £499 for the CDTV unit, remote control and two software titles. The device was released in the United States for $999.

In 1990 Computer Gaming World stated that Commodore had a poor reputation among consumers and developers, citing "abysmal record of customer and technical support in the past". The company chose Amiga-enthusiast magazines as its chief advertising channel, but the Amiga community on the whole avoided the CDTV in the expectation of an add-on CD-ROM drive for the Amiga, which eventually came in the form of the A570. This further hurt sales of the CDTV, as an A570-equipped A500 was electronically the same as a CDTV and, consequently, could run CDTV software, so there was very little motivation for an Amiga owner to buy a CDTV. I felt that I could sell a hundred thousand of something that costs  standing on my head. I thought that it would be a no-brainer. And I can tell you that the number of units that we sold in the U.S. at  you could put in your eye and not draw tears."

The CDTV was supplied with AmigaOS 1.3, rather than the more advanced and user-friendly 2.0 release that was launched at around the same time. Notably, the CDXL motion video format was primarily developed for the CDTV, making it one of the earliest consumer systems to allow video playback directly from CD-ROM.

By 1994 Computer Gaming World described the CDTV as a "fiasco" for Commodore. Though the company later developed an improved and cost-reduced CDTV-II, it was never released. Commodore discontinued the CDTV in 1993 with the launch of the Amiga CD32, which again was substantially based on Amiga hardware (in this case the newer Amiga 1200) but explicitly targeted the games market.

In December 2021 an unofficial free ROM update was released for CDTV (2.35), which brings compatibility with 68030 accelerator boards and 32-bit Fast RAM, allows non-CDTV titles to boot, fixes bugs and restores several features that were lost in the 2.7 and 2.30 ROMs. Because of copyright reasons the custom ROM is distributed in patch form.

Design 

The CDTV was intended as a media appliance rather than a mainstream personal computer. As such, its housing had dimensions and styling that were fairly comparable to most household stereo system components of the period, and it came with an infrared remote control. Similarly, it was initially sold without a keyboard or a mouse (which could be added separately, and were later bundled with the machine). The CDTV was based on the same technology as earlier Amiga systems, but featured a single-speed CD-ROM drive and no floppy disk drive as standard.

Technical specifications

 Notes
<li>North American model
<li>UK model
<li>European model

Official upgrades
The CDTV is compatible with many Amiga peripherals from the same period. In addition, official CDTV peripherals and upgrades included:
Wireless infrared mouse (CD1252)
Wireless trackball
Black styled keyboard
SCSI controller providing both an internal and external SCSI connector for hard disk drives and other SCSI devices
External black styled hard disk drive
External black styled floppy disk drive (CD1411, an FB-354C)
Proprietary memory cards with a capacity of 64 or 256 KB (CD1401/CD1405) allowing storage of game scores and progress
Genlocks for NTSC or PAL (CD1300/CD1301) to overlay video signal with a secondary video source

Versions
CDTV: CDTV unit and remote control/gamepad
Pro pack: CDTV unit, remote control/gamepad, keyboard, mouse and floppy disk drive, along with Almathera CDPD Public domain software compilation on CD-ROM

Games

Market competition

High-end A/V (primary market) 
(multi-purpose audio/video systems)
 Philips' CD-i
 Pioneer's LaserActive
 Tandy Video Information System

Video gaming (secondary market) 
 NEC PC Engine with Super CD-ROM expansion
 Nintendo's SNES
 Sega Mega Drive with CD-ROM expansion
 The 3DO Company's 3DO Interactive Multiplayer

See also 

 Amiga A570
 Amiga CD32
 Amiga models and variants

References

External links 
 

1990s toys
68k-based game consoles
Amiga
CBM hardware
CD-ROM-based consoles
Computer-related introductions in 1991
Fourth-generation video game consoles
Home video game consoles
Products introduced in 1991